Henichesk is a port city along the Sea of Azov in the Kherson Oblast of southern Ukraine. It serves as the administrative centre of Henichesk Raion. Since 9 November 2022, it serves as the temporary centre of the Russian occupation administration in Russian occupied Kherson Oblast. Henichesk hosts the administration of the Henichesk urban hromada, one of the hromadas of Ukraine.

As of November 2022, the city is under Russian occupation as part of the Russian Kherson Oblast. In November 2022, the Ukrainian southern counteroffensive successfully forced to withdraw Russian forces from the city of Kherson. As such, the Russian forces moved their temporary administrative centre to Henichesk, although they still claim Kherson as the official capital in exile.

History 
Henichesk was founded as a fort by the Russian Empire in 1784 and from 1812 was also known as Ust-Ozivske. It was a port and a trade center on the salt route that went from Crimea north to Ukraine and Russia. At the turn of the 20th century, it was the location of one of the largest flour mills in southern Ukraine.

During World War II, the town was occupied by Germany. The Germans operated a Nazi prison in the town.

2022 Russian invasion of Ukraine 

On 24 February 2022, Henichesk was seized by the Russian army in the Russian invasion of Ukraine.

During the Russian capture, a famous incident occurred where an old woman confronted Russian soldiers and said "Put sunflower seeds in your pockets so they grow on Ukraine soil when you die." The city was also the scene of the death of Vitalii Skakun, who died blowing up a bridge to stop the Russian advance.

On 18 April, Russian occupiers restored the monument of Lenin, which had been removed by the Ukrainian government as part of the country's decommunization process.   

On 3 June, Volodymyr Zelenskyy decreed the creation of a military administration for the city.

On 9 November, separatist leader and deputy head of the military–civilian administration of Russian-occupied Kherson, Kirill Stremousov, died in a crash near Henichesk.

Climate
Under the Köppen climate classification, Henichesk has a humid continental climate that closely borders on a semi-arid climate with cold winters and warm summers.

Notable people
Yosyp Abramovych Daits (1897–1954), Ukrainian artist
Iuliia Mendel, Ukrainian journalist

Gallery

See also
 List of cities in Ukraine

References

External links

 Non-official city site

Cities in Kherson Oblast
Port cities and towns of the Azov Sea
Port cities and towns in Ukraine
Cities of district significance in Ukraine
Spa towns in Ukraine
Populated places established in 1784
Populated places established in the Russian Empire
1784 establishments in the Russian Empire